Shaker Maker is a toy for making figures. Water and a powder must be mixed in a shaker and after turning the shaker the mixture flows into moulds inside the shaker. Because of fast polymerisation the consistency of the mixture becomes like pudding in seconds. After some days it hardens.

Shaker Maker was invented in the 1970s by the firm Ideal Toy Company. The toy was primarily sold in the US and some countries in Europe. In the 1990s and the 2000s there were two relaunches of Shaker Maker but these met with less success.

Principle

Shaker Maker is a toy for children aged four years and older which makes it easy for them to make their own toy figures. The base element is a powder called "Magic Mix" which comes in a range of colours. After mixing with water it has to be shaken. After some seconds the shaker has to be turned so that the mixture can flow into a mould which is installed in the shaker. After five to ten minutes the mixture hardens, and the figures are ready to be taken out of their mould and placed on a drying stand. The figures shrink dramatically as they dry, and final drying can take another few days. When the figures are completely dry they can be painted and decorated.

History
First created by ALLEN GREENBERG and licensed to the Ideal Toy Company, it appeared in stores in the early 1970s. In the early 1990s, Toymax, a New York-based company licensed it from the inventor, ALLEN GREENBERG, and started producing it again. After that it was reissued by the Canadian firm Spin Master in 2003, and later by Flair.

Sets

The sets of Ideal and Toymax are compatible. A sample of sets:

Ideal
 People Series No. 1 (1971): Hippies.
 Disney characters (1972): Mickey Mouse, Donald Duck and Pluto
 The Flintstones characters (1973)
 Switchables (1973) 
 Batman Playset
 Magic Roundabout Characters - Florence, Dougal and Zebedee (1974)
 Hairy Bunch (Glow in the Dark)

Toymax
 Trolls
 Monsters
 Shrunken Headz

Spin Master and Flair Create
 Spider-Man
 Care Bears
 Hulk
 Disney Princess 
 Dinosaurs
 Favourite Pets
 Scooby-Doo 
 Batman
 Ben 10
 The Simpsons
 Disney Fairies
 Star Wars
 Toy Story
 Minnie Mouse
 Tatty Teddy
 Doctor Who
 Dora the Explorer
 Go Diego Go!
 Gormiti
 Tree Fu Tom
 Puppy in my Pocket
 Bakugan Battle Brawlers
 Superman
 Teenage Mutant Ninja Turtles

Miscellaneous
English band Oasis has a song Shakermaker on their 1994 album Definitely Maybe. The song contains a number of references to British culture and children's toys of the 1970s, including Shaker Maker.

References

External links

 Spot of the Seventies (Youtube)

1970s toys
Ideal Toy Company